In Catholic canon law, an interdict is an ecclesiastical censure, or ban that prohibits certain persons or groups from participating in particular  rites, or that the rites and services of the church are prohibited in certain territories for a limited or extended time.

Definition
An interdict is a censure, or prohibition, excluding the faithful from participation in certain holy things, such as the Liturgy, the sacraments (excepting private administrations of those that are of necessity), and ecclesiastical burial, including all funeral services.

The prohibition varies in degree, according to the different kinds of interdicts. Interdicts are either local or personal. The former affect territories or sacred buildings; the latter directly affect persons. A general local interdict is one affecting a whole territory, district, town, etc., and this was the ordinary interdict of the Middle Ages; a particular local interdict is one affecting, for example, a particular church. A general personal interdict is one falling on a given body or group of people as a class, e.g. on a chapter, the clergy or people of a town, or a community; a particular personal interdict is one affecting certain individuals as such, for instance, a given bishop, a given cleric.

Interdict differs from excommunication, in that it does not cut one off from the communion of the faithful. It differs from suspension also in that the latter affects the faculties of clerics, while the interdict affects the access of the faithful to religious rites. While the clergy cannot exercise their functions towards those under interdict, or in interdicted places or buildings, their powers are not directly affected, as happens in case of suspension.

1917 Code of Canon Law

Distinctions
Only the Holy See was empowered to impose a general interdict on a diocese or State or a personal interdict on the people of a diocese or country, but bishops too could impose a general interdict on a parish or on the people of a parish or a particular interdict on a place (such as a church or oratory, an altar or a cemetery) or a person.

Effects

A local interdict forbade in general the public celebration of sacred rites. Exceptions were made for the dying, and local interdicts were almost entirely suspended on five feasts of the year: Christmas Day, Easter Sunday, Pentecost, Corpus Christi and the feast of the Assumption of Mary.

Those who were under personal interdict were forbidden to be present at any religious rite except the preaching of the word of God; while mere attendance by them did not require that they be expelled, if they were well known to be under interdict they were to be prevented from taking an active part.

1983 Code of Canon Law

An interdict today has the effect of forbidding the person concerned to celebrate or receive any of the sacraments, including the Eucharist, or to celebrate the sacramentals. One who is under interdict is also forbidden to take any ministerial part (e.g., as a reader if a layperson or as a deacon or priest if a clergyman) in the celebration of the Eucharist or of any other ceremony of public worship.

These are the only effects for those who have incurred a latae sententiae interdict, namely, one incurred automatically at the moment of committing the offence for which canon law imposes that penalty. For instance, a priest may not refuse Communion publicly to those who are under merely automatic interdict, even if he knows that they have incurred this kind of interdict – unless the cause for the interdict is known to the priest not only privately but publicly, and is persistent, in which case (though not technically by reason of the interdict) people are to be withheld Communion by force of can. 915.

However, in the case of a ferendae sententiae interdict, one incurred only when imposed by a legitimate superior or declared as the sentence of an ecclesiastical court, those affected are not to be admitted to Holy Communion (see canon 915), and if they violate the prohibition against taking a ministerial part in celebrating the Eucharist or some other ceremony of public worship, they are to be expelled or the sacred rite suspended, unless there is a grave reason to the contrary. In the same circumstances, local ordinaries and parish priests lose their right to assist validly at marriages.

Automatic (latae sententiae) interdict is incurred by anyone using physical violence against a bishop, as also by a person who, not being an ordained priest, attempts to celebrate Mass, or who, though unable to give valid sacramental absolution, attempts to do so, or hears a sacramental confession.
Automatic interdict is also incurred by anyone falsely accusing a priest of soliciting sexual favours in connection with confession or attempting to marry while having a perpetual vow of chastity.
 
An interdict is also the censure that canon law says should be imposed on someone who, because of some act of ecclesiastical authority or ministry publicly incites to hatred against the Holy See or the Ordinary, or who promotes or takes up office in an association that plots against the Church, or who commits the crime of simony.

Notable local canonical interdicts

Norway 
Pope Innocent III placed the Kingdom of Norway under interdict in October 1198. Although King Sverre forged letters to show that the interdict had been lifted, he and his subjects remained under interdict until Sverre's death in 1202.

England 
Pope Innocent III also placed the kingdom of England under an interdict for six years between March 1208 and May 1213, after King John refused to accept the pope's appointee Stephen Langton as Archbishop of Canterbury.

Scotland 
Following the rejection by Robert the Bruce (crowned King of Scotland in 1306) of papal mediation between England and Scotland, Pope John XXII placed Scotland under interdict in 1317 or 1318 because of continuing Scots raids into England; in 1328 the same Pope lifted the interdict in the light of the Treaty of Edinburgh–Northampton.

Hungary 
 The town of Buda was placed under an interdict by papal legate Niccolò Boccasini in 1303, who was sent there to build support for Charles of Anjou, Pope Boniface VIII's favoured candidate for the Hungarian throne. In response, the burghers of Buda excommunicated the Pope and all bishops and priests loyal to him.

Italy 

 Rome itself was placed under interdict by Pope Adrian IV as a result of a rebellion led by Arnold of Brescia in 1155. 
Pope Gregory XI placed the city of Florence under interdict in March 1376 during the War of the Eight Saints.  
 Pope Sixtus IV decreed an interdict against the Republic of Florence in 1478 in response to the hanging of Francesco Salviati (bishop) in response to his involvement in the Pazzi conspiracy.
 On 23 June 1482, Pope Sixtus IV decreed an interdict against the Republic of Venice, unless it abandoned within 15 days its siege of Ferrara. The Venetians managed to evade it by an appeal to a future council.
 On 27 April 1509, as he entered the War of the League of Cambrai, aiming to recover papal control of the Romagna, where Venice had seized several cities in 1503, Pope Julius II issued an interdict against Venice. When Venice accepted peace terms on 14 February 1510, the interdict was lifted.
 The Venetian Interdict of 1606-1607 is a better known and more lengthy case. Pope Paul V placed the Republic of Venice under interdict in 1606 after the civil authorities jailed two priests.
In 1909, the town of Adria in Italy was placed under interdict for 15 days after a local campaign against the move of a bishop.

Malta 
Interdiction featured in 20th-century Maltese politics.

Between 1930 and 1933, those who voted for the progressive Compact parties (Constitutional Party, Labour Party) were interdicted and refused burial in sacred grounds. Once again, between 8 April 1961 and 4 April 1969, the National Executive of the Malta Labour Party was interdicted and voting Labour became a mortal sin; the leadership of the Malta Labour Party, readers, advertisers and distributors of Party papers as well as its voters were interdicted by the local bishop. In both cases, the Nationalist Party won elections while its opponents were interdicted.

France 
Pope Innocent III put the whole kingdom of France under interdict on 13 January 1200 to force Philip II of France to take his wife Ingeborg of Denmark back. After a reconciliation ceremony, the interdict was lifted on 12 September 1200.

United States
In 1955, after white parishioners had refused to let a black priest enter a chapel situated about 20 miles from New Orleans, Archbishop Joseph Rummel placed the chapel under interdict.

Notable personal canonical interdicts

Bishop René Henry Gracida of Corpus Christi, Texas interdicted a Roman Catholic politician in the late 20th century for supporting legal abortion; the unnamed individual died while under interdict.

See also
 Excommunication (Catholic Church)
 Dima Yakovlev Law
 Magnitsky Act
 Magnitsky legislation

References

External links
 

Catholic penal canon law
History of Malta
Catholic Church legal terminology